Carlos Tosca (born September 29, 1953, in Pinar del Río, Cuba) is the current Field coach for the GCL Orioles. He is a former Major League and minor league baseball manager.  He was the manager of the Toronto Blue Jays from 2002 to 2004. He succeeded Buck Martinez on June 3, 2002, served the entire  season, and was replaced by John Gibbons on August 8, 2004, after compiling a 191–191 win–loss record (.500).

Tosca is a graduate of the University of South Florida.  He did not play professional baseball, but became a coach at the high school level after his graduation.  In 1978, he entered pro baseball as a coach in the Short Season-A New York–Penn League.

Biography
Tosca managed in the farm systems of the New York Yankees, Kansas City Royals, Florida Marlins and Atlanta Braves for 17 seasons between 1980 and 2001. He was the first manager in the history of the Portland Sea Dogs of the Double-A Eastern League, serving as their pilot from 1994 to 1996.  He has managed at the highest level of minor league baseball with the Triple-A Charlotte Knights (1997) and Richmond Braves (2001), and was the bench coach on Buck Showalter's staff during the first three MLB seasons (1998–2000) in Arizona Diamondbacks history.

Tosca was hired as third base coach of the Blue Jays for the 2002 season by the club's recently appointed general manager, J. P. Ricciardi.  When Toronto started poorly (20–33, .377) under Martinez—who had been hired by former GM Gord Ash—Ricciardi replaced the incumbent manager with Tosca.  Over the final two-thirds of the campaign, Tosca led the Jays to a 58–51 (.523) mark and a third-place finish in the American League East Division. Tosca then produced another winning record (86–76, .531) and third-place finish in 2003. But in 2004, the Jays won only 47 of their first 111 games (.423) and were in fifth place in their division when Tosca was relieved of command by Ricciardi.  The Jays finished the campaign at 67–94 (.416).

After returning to the D-Backs in 2005–2006 to coach third base under manager Bob Melvin, Tosca was the bench coach of the Marlins under Fredi González from 2007 to June 22, 2010.

When González was hired to replace Bobby Cox as the manager of the Braves following the 2010 season, Tosca was hired to serve as the Braves' new bench coach. He managed the Braves on May 10 and 11, 2013 due to González' daughter's college graduation.

On May 17, 2016, both Tosca and González were dismissed from the Atlanta Braves.

In February 2019, Tosca was named as the Field Coach for the GCL Orioles.

Managerial record

Personal
Tosca has an identical twin brother named Rick.

References

External links

1953 births
Living people
American people of Cuban descent
Arizona Diamondbacks coaches
Atlanta Braves coaches
Florida Marlins coaches
Major League Baseball bench coaches
Major League Baseball first base coaches
Major League Baseball third base coaches
Portland Sea Dogs managers
American twins
Twin sportspeople
Toronto Blue Jays coaches
Toronto Blue Jays managers
University of South Florida alumni
Cuban baseball coaches